Hokatu is a village on the island of Ua Huka in the Marquesas Islands in French Polynesia.

Hokatu is the smallest of the three villages on the island, and lies three kilometers to the southeast of Hane. Its bay has good anchorage in a small natural harbor and is visited by the Aranui 3. Hokatu is well known for its woodcarvers and contains a craft center where you can purchase the products of the inhabitants, along with three museums which open during tourist season. Nearby the village, at the bottom of the valley, there lie the foundations of an ancient settlement known as a paepae.

References

Populated places in the Marquesas Islands
Ua Huka